Kareena Lee (born 16 December 1993) is an Australian swimmer, specialising in open water events. She competed in the women's 10 km event at the 2019 World Aquatics Championships and she finished in 7th place. In April 2021, she qualified to represent Australia at the 2020 Summer Olympics where she claimed bronze in the 10km event after occupying 15th position of 25 at 5.2km.

Lee was hopeful in competing in the 2016 Rio Olympic Games but failed to compete in the 2015 World Aquatic Championships, when she collapsed and was hospitalised following the Women's 10km Open Water Race. She was treated for a combination of asthma, dehydration, hypothermia and a facial injury. Although devastated, Lee's determination and grit saw her qualifying for the 2020 Tokyo Olympic Games.

References

External links
 

1993 births
Living people
Australian female swimmers
Place of birth missing (living people)
Female long-distance swimmers
Olympic swimmers of Australia
Swimmers at the 2020 Summer Olympics
Medalists at the 2020 Summer Olympics
Olympic bronze medalists in swimming
Olympic bronze medalists for Australia
21st-century Australian women